Pein is a surname. Notable people with the surname include:

Anton Pein (born 1967), Austrian darts player
Friedrich Pein (1915–1975), Austrian sniper
Malcolm Pein (born 1960), British chess player, author, and journalist

See also
Peen (disambiguation)